The National Sheep Association (NSA) is the trade association in the UK for sheep farming.

The Association is funded by its membership of sheep farmers and its activities involve it in every aspect of the sheep industry.

History
It was formed in 1892 as the National Sheep Breeders Association. In 1969 it changed to its present name. It was initially established to facilitate communication between progressive breeders and improve sheep breeding management as well as provide a unified voice for the sheep industry.

Structure
It is situated near the Three Counties Crossroads of the B4208 and Hanley Road (B4209) near Hanley Swan, opposite Langdale Wood, specifically in the north-east corner of the Three Counties Showground. It receives no government funding.

Regions
 Central
 Marches (Welsh border area)
 Eastern
 South East
 South West
 Wales
 Northern
 NSA Scotland
 Northern Ireland

Function
It represents the UK sheep industry. NSA Scotland hosts the annual Scotsheep event. There is the NSA South Sheep event. Every two years (biennial) it has the NSA Sheep event at the Three Counties Showground.

It publishes the trade journal every two months called Sheep Farmer.

See also
 NSA Scotland 
Agriculture and Horticulture Development Board (AHDB)
Hybu Cig Cymru (HCC) 
Quality Meat Scotland (QMS)
Livestock & Meat Commission (LMC) 
List of sheep breeds

References

External links
 National Sheep Association
 NSA Sheep show
 NSA Wales and Border Ram Sales

News items
 Sheep taxi service in July 2009
 Llamas guarding lambs in West Sussex in June 2008
 Livestock farmers under threat in November 2007
 Mutton gambols in October 2007
 Sheep industry improving in September 2004
 Sheep working out cattle grids in West Yorkshire in July 2004
 EU help in September 1999
 Proposed EU ban on meat-on-the-bone in December 1999

Organisations based in Worcestershire
Organizations established in 1892
Sheep farming in the United Kingdom
Malvern Hills
Agricultural organisations based in the United Kingdom
Meat industry organizations